Vincent Joseph Riendeau (born April 20, 1966) is a Canadian former professional ice hockey goaltender. During his time in the National Hockey League, which lasted from 1987 to 1995, Riendeau played for the Montreal Canadiens, St. Louis Blues, Detroit Red Wings, and the Boston Bruins. Riendeau was the first Canadian and former NHL player to sign with a professional hockey team in the Russian Superleague. As of January 2019) he has been the director of goalie development for the Canadiens.

Playing career

Amateur career
Riendeau was born in Saint-Hyacinthe, Quebec. As a youth, he played in the 1978 and 1979 Quebec International Pee-Wee Hockey Tournaments with a minor ice hockey team from Drummondville.

He played junior ice hockey with the Verdun Juniors in the QMJHL during the 1983–84 season, posting a 22-13-2 record with 2 shutouts and a 4.14 goals against average. He also played 15 games for the Des Moines Buccaneers of the USHL during the same season.

The following season, Riendeau left the junior leagues to play Canadian college hockey for Sherbrooke College of the CEGEP.

Riendeau returned to the juniors for the 1985–86 season, suiting up for the Drummondville Voltigeurs of the QMJHL. With a record of 33-20-3, Riendeau was able to sign as an undrafted free agent with the Montreal Canadiens before his season ended in the juniors.

Career with Montreal
Riendeau would spend the 1986–87 and 1987–88 seasons playing for Montreal's minor league affiliate, the Sherbrooke Canadiens of the AHL. In his first professional season, Riendeau was awarded the Harry "Hap" Holmes Trophy for allowing the fewest goals-against in the AHL. Despite posting winning records in the minors, Riendeau suffered in his only appearance for Montreal during the 1987–88 season, in which he allowed 5 goals in 36 minutes. With Montreal already having excellent goaltending from Patrick Roy and Brian Hayward, Riendeau was traded to St. Louis on 9 August 1988 with Sergio Momesso for Jocelyn Lemieux, Darrell May and St. Louis's 2nd choice (which became Patrice Brisebois) in the 1989 NHL Entry Draft.

Career with St. Louis
Riendeau was excited for his debut with St. Louis during the 1988–89 season. His first game was set to be on the road in Hartford. His parents traveled from his native Quebec to watch their son's opening night, only to have teammate Dave Lowry hit Riendeau's shoulder with a hard shot during the pre-game warm-up, putting him out of action for the night.  Riendeau was able to establish himself as a solid member of the Blues, backing up Greg Millen for that season. Riendeau did not see any time in the playoffs.

Riendeau would establish himself as the starting goaltender for the 1989–90 season, in which he would be supported by Millen and Curtis Joseph. He was able to make his first playoff appearance with the Blues that season as well. While Joseph was the goaltender who led St. Louis in the opening round of the playoffs, Riendeau took over during the second round, in which they were eliminated by the Chicago Blackhawks.

Riendeau's most successful season in the NHL was the 1990–91 season, in which he posted a 29-9-6 record in 44 games, with Joseph serving as his backup.  Riendeau would once again lead St. Louis into the playoffs. While they eliminated Detroit in the opening round, they lost to the Minnesota North Stars in the next round. In the playoffs, Bob Probert punched Riendeau after Riendeau pointed Probert's actions out to a referee in an unsuccessful attempt to draw a penalty.

Career with Detroit
For the start of the 1991–92 season, St. Louis opted to go with Joseph as their starting goaltender and prospects Guy Hebert and Pat Jablonski in the backup role. On 18 October 1991, Riendeau was traded to Detroit for Rick Zombo. Riendeau would make his first appearance for Detroit on 25 October 1991 against the Toronto Maple Leafs, in which he would suffer a knee injury 27 minutes into the game, during a shared shutout with Tim Cheveldae, and sideline him for most of the season. When Riendeau recovered, he went on to backup Cheveldae for the remainder of the season and into the playoffs, where they were eliminated by Chicago in the second round.

Riendeau continued to support Cheveldae during the 1992–93 season, appearing in 22 regular season games. Riendeau did not appear in any playoff games that season, where Detroit was eliminated in the opening round by the Toronto Maple Leafs.

Career with Boston
By the time the 1993–94 season came around, Detroit gave the starting goaltender position to Chris Osgood and designated Cheveldae as his back up.  Riendeau had now become Detroit's third goaltender. After appearing in 8 games for Detroit and 10 games for their minor league affiliate, the Adirondack Red Wings of the AHL, Riendeau was traded to Boston on 17 January 1994 for a conditional 5th round draft choice in 1995 Entry Draft, which became Chad Wilchynski. Boston was able to send John Blue to the minors so that Riendeau could support Jon Casey. The duo led Boston into the playoffs, where they lost in the second round to the New Jersey Devils.

Riendeau continued his role as a backup during the 1994–95 season, supporting Blaine Lacher. Riendeau did not fare well during the regular season, posting a 3-6-1 record, leaving Boston to rely on Lacher in the playoffs, where Boston was eliminated in the opening round by New Jersey, who were the eventual Stanley Cup Champions. Riendeau did participate in one playoff game for the minor league affiliate Providence Bruins of the AHL that season. On 21 August 1995, Riendeau was released by Boston.

Career after the NHL
Riendeau spent the 1995–96 season with SC Riessersee Garmisch-Partenkirchen in Germany, where he appeared in 47 games.

Riendeau would return to North America for the 1996–97 season, where he would play for the Manitoba Moose of the IHL. Despite having a prolific previous season, Riendeau would post a 10-18-5 record at a minor league level.

Riendeau began to believe that his playing career was over when he received an offer from the German club ECR Revier Lowen Ratingen during the summer prior to the 1997–98 season. After appearing in 14 games, the club began to suffer financial difficulties, causing Riendeau to sign on with HC Lugano of the Swiss Nationalliga A, where he would appear in one game.

Riendeau found himself with the Ayr Scottish Eagles of the British Ice Hockey Superleague for the start of the 1998–99. Riendeau would play both regular season games and in tournaments, where he would come to play against members of the Russian Superleague. Riendeau admired the Russians work ethic and sought to join the Russian Superleague. After playing in 32 games and tournament appearances, a clause in Riendeau's contract came into effect in January 1999 that the club had to renegotiate his contract. Riendeau was able to negotiate a deal to be released by Ayr and join HC Lada Togliatti of the Russian Superleague. Riendeau would go on to appear in 5 regular season contests and 7 playoff contests. Riendeau would continue to play for Lada Togliatti for the 1999–00 season, appearing in 16 regular season games and one playoff game.

Riendeau would return to North America for the 2000–01 season and play his final professional season with the Anchorage Aces of the WCHL. Riendeau posted an 8-10-2 record backing up Dan McIntyre.

Post-playing career
Following his retirement, Riendeau would become a goaltending consultant for the Toronto Maple Leafs, a move that allowed him to work with Joseph again.  Riendeau would then spend the 2004–05 season as the goaltender coach for the Cape Breton Screaming Eagles of the QMJHL. He is the leader of the Winter Hawks NAHA-Riendeau Goalie Camp. Riendeau worked as Goalkeeper Coach with Hamburg Freezers in Germany.

In 2012, Riendeau joined the Canadiens organization as a goaltending consultant to their AHL affiliate, the Hamilton Bulldogs. In 2014, he was named as an assistant general manager of the Bulldogs, a role he continued after the Canadiens AHL affiliate relocated to Newfoundland and Labrador and took control of the IceCaps in 2015.

As of 2019 he is the director of goalie development for the Canadiens.

Career statistics

Regular season and playoffs

Coaching clubs

Goalkeeper coach
 Toronto Maple Leafs (2001)
 Adler Mannheim (2005–2007)
 HC Fribourg-Gottéron (2007)
 Kassel Huskies (2008–2009)
 Hamburg Freezers (2010–2014)

References

External links
 
Official site

1966 births
Living people
Adirondack Red Wings players
Anchorage Aces players
Ayr Scottish Eagles players
Boston Bruins players
Canadian expatriate ice hockey players in Scotland
Canadian expatriate ice hockey players in Germany
Canadian expatriate ice hockey players in Russia
Canadian expatriate ice hockey players in Switzerland
Canadian ice hockey coaches
Canadian ice hockey goaltenders
Des Moines Buccaneers players
Detroit Red Wings players
Drummondville Voltigeurs players
French Quebecers
HC Lada Togliatti players
HC Lugano players
Ice hockey people from Quebec
Ice Hockey Superleague players
Manitoba Moose (IHL) players
Montreal Canadiens coaches
Montreal Canadiens players
Montreal Canadiens scouts
Providence Bruins players
Revier Löwen players
St. Louis Blues players
SC Riessersee players
Sherbrooke Canadiens players
Sportspeople from Saint-Hyacinthe
Toronto Maple Leafs coaches
Undrafted National Hockey League players
Verdun Juniors players